Andy Platt (born 9 October 1963) is an English former professional rugby league footballer who played as a  and  forward in the 1980s and 1990s.

A Great Britain international representative , he played for English clubs St Helens, Wigan, Widnes and Salford, as well as in New Zealand for the Auckland Warriors.

Background
Andy Platt was born in Billinge Higher End, Wigan, England

Playing career

St Helens
He started his professional career at St Helens as a ball-playing second rower, joining from amateur club Wigan St Patricks in June 1982. He made his debut for Saints on 22 August 1982 in a 19–19 draw against Leigh in a league match during the 1982–83 season. He rose to national prominence and represented Great Britain. He was selected to go on the 1988 Great Britain Lions tour.

Platt played  in St Helens 28-16 victory over Wigan in the 1984 Lancashire Cup Final during the 1984–85 season at Central Park, Wigan on Sunday 28 October 1984.

Platt played  in St. Helens' 15-14 victory over Leeds in the 1987–88 John Player Special Trophy Final during the 1987–88 season at Central Park, Wigan on Saturday 9 January 1988.

Wigan
In September 1988, Platt was signed by Wigan for a club record fee of £140,000. He was part of the team that dominated British rugby league football in the early 1990s. During the 1991–92 Rugby Football League season, Platt played for defending champions Wigan at prop forward in their 1991 World Club Challenge victory against the visiting Penrith. He was selected to go on the 1992 Great Britain Lions tour of Australia and New Zealand, and was named man-of-the-match in the tourists' victory over Australia in the second Ashes. 
During the 1992–93 Rugby Football League season Platt played at prop forward for defending RFL champions Wigan in the 1992 World Club Challenge against the visiting Brisbane Broncos.  In 1993 Platt won the Man of Steel Award.

Platt played  in Wigan's 22-17 victory over Salford in the 1988 Lancashire Cup Final during the 1988–89 season at Knowsley Road, St. Helens on Sunday 23 October 1988. and played right- in the 5-4 victory over St. Helens in the 1992 Lancashire Cup Final during the 1992–93 season at Knowsley Road, St. Helens on Sunday 18 October 1992.

Platt played  and was sin binned after 53-minutes for brawling with Halifax's Bernard Hill in Wigan's 24-12 victory over Halifax in the 1989–90 Regal Trophy Final during the 1989–90 season at Headingley, Leeds on Saturday 13 January 1990, played right- in the 15-8 victory over Bradford Northern in the 1992–93 Regal Trophy Final during the 1992–93 season at Elland Road, Leeds on Saturday 23 January 1993, and played right- in the 2-33 defeat by Castleford in the 1993–94 Regal Trophy Final during the 1993–94 season at Elland Road, Leeds on Saturday 22 January 1994.

Auckland Warriors
In 1994 Platt signed with the new Auckland Warriors franchise of the Australian Rugby League, following John Monie, Dean Bell, Denis Betts and Frano Botica. He represented England at the 1995 Rugby League World Cup. Platt became one of only two players to win England caps whilst at the Auckland Warriors, whilst Denis Betts is the only player to win both England and Great Britain caps whilst at the Auckland Warriors. He was selected to play for in the tournament's final at prop forward but Australia won the match and retained the Cup.  Platt finished his career back in England with Salford.

References

External links
(archived by web.archive.org) Wigan Warriors profile
 Profile at saints.org.uk
 Profile at rugby.widnes.tv
(archived by web.archive.org) Crooks in trouble

1963 births
Living people
England national rugby league team players
English rugby league players
Great Britain national rugby league team captains
Great Britain national rugby league team players
New Zealand Warriors players
Rugby league locks
Rugby league players from Wigan
Rugby league props
Rugby league second-rows
Salford Red Devils players
St Helens R.F.C. players
Wigan Warriors players
Workington Town coaches
Workington Town players